Mr. Potato Head is an American toy brand consisting of a plastic model of a potato "head" to which a variety of plastic parts can attach — typically ears, eyes, shoes, hat, nose, pants and mouth.

Mr. Potato Head was invented and manufactured by George Lerner in 1949, but was first distributed by Hasbro in 1952. It was the first toy advertised on television and has remained in production since.

In its original form, Mr. Potato Head was offered as separate plastic parts with pushpins to be attached into a real potato or other vegetable. Due to complaints regarding rotting vegetables and new government safety regulations, Hasbro began including a plastic potato body with the toy set in 1964. The original toy was subsequently joined by Mrs. Potato Head and supplemented with accessories including a car and boat trailer.

Mr. and Mrs. Potato Head both appeared in the Toy Story franchise, voiced by Don Rickles and Estelle Harris. Additionally, in 1998, The Mr. Potato Head Show aired but was short-lived, with only one season being produced. As one of the prominent marks of Hasbro, a Mr. Potato Head balloon has also joined others in the annual Macy's Thanksgiving Day Parade. Toy Story Midway Mania!, in Disney California Adventure at the Disneyland Resort, also features a large talking Mr. Potato Head.

Hasbro updated the brand in 2021, dropping the honorific in the name and marketing the toy simply as Potato Head, while retaining the individual characters of Mr. and Mrs. Potato Head.

History
In the early 1940s, Brooklyn-born toy inventor George Lerner came up with the idea of inserting small, pronged body and face parts into fruits and vegetables to create a "funny face man". Some speculate he got the idea from his wife's nephew Aaron Bradley, who was seen placing sticks inside of potatoes in the family garden. Lerner would often take potatoes from his mother's garden and, using various other fruits and vegetables as facial features, he would make dolls with which his younger sisters could play. The grape-eyed, carrot-nosed, potato-headed dolls became the principal idea behind the plastic toy which would later be manufactured.

Originally, Lerner's toy proved controversial. With World War II and food rationing a recent memory for most Americans, the use of fruits and vegetables to make toys was considered irresponsible and wasteful. Toy companies rejected Lerner's creation. After several years of trying to sell the toy, Lerner finally convinced a food company to distribute the plastic parts as premiums in breakfast cereal boxes. He sold the idea for $5,000. In 1951, Lerner showed the idea to Henry and Merrill Hassenfeld, who conducted a small school supply and toy business called Hassenfeld Brothers (later changed to Hasbro). Realizing the toy was quite unlike anything in their line, they paid the cereal company $2,000 to stop production and bought the rights for $5,000. Lerner was offered an advance of $500 and a 5% royalty on every kit sold. The toy was named Mr. Potato Head and went into production on May 1, 1952.

The original set cost $0.98, and included toy hands, feet, ears, two mouths, two pairs of eyes, four noses, three hats, eyeglasses, a pipe, and eight felt pieces resembling facial hair. The original kit included no potato "body", relying on parents to provide a potato, into which children could stick the different pieces. Shortly after the toy's initial release, an order form for 50 additional pieces was enclosed in every kit.

On April 30, 1952, Mr. Potato Head became the first toy advertised on television. The campaign was also the first to be aimed directly at children; before this, commercials were only targeted at adults, including toy advertisements. The commercial revolutionized marketing, and caused an industrial boom. Over one million kits were sold in the first year. In 1953, a Mrs. Potato Head variant was added, and soon after, Brother Spud and Sister Yam completed the family, followed by accessories reflecting the affluence of the 1950s: a car, boat trailer, kitchen set, stroller, and pets marketed as Spud-ettes. Originally produced as separate plastic parts to be attached to a real potato or other vegetable, however in the early 1960s, government regulations forced the Potato Head parts to be less sharp, leaving them unable to puncture vegetables easily. Children were also choking on the small pieces or cutting themselves with the sharp pieces, so by 1964, the company included a plastic potato "body" in its kit. About this time, Hasbro introduced Oscar the Orange and Pete the Pepper, a plastic orange and green pepper with attachable face parts similar to Mr. Potato Head's. Each came with Mr. Potato Head in a separate kit. Female characters Katie the Carrot and Cooky the Cucumber also made an appearance. Hasbro also made a fast food based line called Mr. Potato Head's Picnic Pals. Some characters were Mr. Soda Pop Head and Frankie Frank. The friends and pals were later discontinued, but Funko revived Oscar and Pete as bobbleheads (along with a Mr. Potato Head bobblehead) in 2002.

In 1975, the main potato part of the toy doubled in size and the dimensions of its accessories were similarly increased. This was done mainly because of new toy child safety regulations that were introduced by the U.S. government. The size change increased the market to younger children, enabling them to play and attach the facial pieces easily. Hasbro also replaced the holes with flat slats, allowing only one possible orientation for the attached parts. In the 1980s, Hasbro reduced the range of accessories for Mr. Potato Head to one set of parts. The company reintroduced round holes in the main potato body, and once again parts were able to go onto the toy in any orientation.

In 1985, Mr. Potato Head received four postal votes in the run for mayor of Boise, Idaho in the "most votes for Mr. Potato Head in a political campaign" as verified by Guinness World Records.

In 1987, Mr. Potato Head became "Spokespud" for the annual Great American Smokeout and surrendered his pipe to Surgeon General C. Everett Koop in Washington, D.C.

In 1995, Mr. Potato head was featured in a leading role in the Disney/Pixar animated feature Toy Story, with the voice provided by comedian Don Rickles. Potato Head returned in Toy Story's three sequels - Toy Story 2 (1999), Toy Story 3 (2010) and Toy Story 4 (2019) - with Rickles reprising the role.

In 1995, Mr. Potato Head Pals was made. This box has hats, mouths, and pairs of shoes in different colors. It also has four bodies and eight hands while the eyes and nose are the same and four cards and every card has each name and a spinner is also included.

In 2000, Mr. Potato Head was inducted into the National Toy Hall of Fame at The Strong in Rochester, New York.

In 2006, Hasbro also began to sell sets of pieces without bodies for customers to add to their collections. Some of these themed sets included Chef, Construction Worker, Firefighter, Halloween, King, Mermaid, Police Officer, Pirate, Princess, Rockstar, and Santa Claus. In the same year, Hasbro introduced a line called "Sports Spuds" with a generic plastic potato (smaller than the standard size) customized to a wide variety of professional and collegiate teams.

In 2020, Hasbro announced a sustainable version of the toy known as Mr. Potato Head Goes Green. This version was made from plant-based plastic derived from sugarcane.

In February 2021 Hasbro announced a new gender-neutral version of the toy line, dropping the formal gender titles, unveiling a new "Potato Head" logo, and offering an expanded playset. While continuing to offer the classic Mr. and Mrs. characters, Hasbro was praised by some for being progressive, while others called it a "PR stunt".

Versions
In recent years, Hasbro had produced Mr. Potato Head sets based on media properties that Hasbro produces toys for under license. These include the Star Wars-themed "Darth Tater", "Spud Trooper", and "R2-POTATOO", a 2007 Transformers film-themed "Optimash Prime" (the appearance is based on Optimus Prime from the original television series), a pair of Spider-Man-themed "Spider-Spud / Peter Tater" (both red suit and black suit, to tie in with Spider-Man 3), an Indiana Jones-themed "Taters of the Lost Ark" set (which, despite the title, was released as a tie-in to 2008's Indiana Jones and the Kingdom of the Crystal Skull), an Iron Man 2-themed "Tony Starch", and a "Trick or Tater" version for Halloween in October 2008. An additional five Star Wars-themed potato heads were sold exclusively through Disney theme parks: "Luke Frywalker", "Yam Solo", "Spuda Fett", "Princess Tater", and "Darth Mash".

In 2009, "Bumble Spud" was produced based on Transformers: Revenge of the Fallen. A Kiss version of Mr. Potato Head was produced recently. Disney, in cooperation with Hasbro, also released "Chipbacca", "Mashter Yoda", and "C-3PotatO" in October 2009 at Disney Parks. To celebrate Toy Story 3, five new Mr. Potato Heads were unveiled including Woody, Buzz Lightyear, Jessie, Mrs. Potato Head, and the classic Mr. Potato Head. To promote The Looney Tunes Show, Hasbro unveiled Bugs Bunny-, Daffy Duck-, and Tasmanian Devil-themed Mr. Potato Head dolls.

In 2011, it was announced at the New York Toy Fair that a second Elvis Mr. Potato Head (based on his 1968 TV special) would be released, as well as sets for The Wizard of Oz (Dorothy, Scarecrow, Tin Man and the Lion), the Three Stooges, Star Trek (Kirk and Kor), and SpongeBob SquarePants. These were all released through PPW toys. From Hasbro.

Since 2011, new models of the Mr. Potato Head toys, commonly referred to as Jason, have been produced. The Mrs. Potato Head version of the toy was also brought out in early 2012, commonly known as Rachel, and has a baked bean-like head. In 2012, Hasbro and PPW Toys released Mr. Potato Head in Batman form for the movie The Dark Knight Rises. The model, known as "The Dark Spud", features Mr. Potato Head dressed up as the Caped Crusader. Before the release, the model was unveiled at the 2012 New York Toy Fair. In 2014, to celebrate The Simpsons 25th anniversary, a Homer Simpson Mr. Potato Head was produced.

In 2019, Toy Story 4-themed Mr. and Mrs. Potato Heads were released. These versions feature the "Jason" model of the spuds with a mix of various parts, including the classic versions of the arms and shoes, (near) film-accurate facial features and the newer designs of the parts.

On April Fools Day 2019, Hasbro jokingly announced that Mr. Potato Head would be replaced by "Mr. Avo Head", a hipster avocado.

In popular culture
 

Mr. Potato Head's popularity has led to some appearances in films and television. In 1985, Mr. Potato Head played a supporting role in Potato Head Kids, his first dramatic television appearance. From 1998 to 1999, he had his own short-lived Fox Kids series The Mr. Potato Head Show. In addition to film and television, the character has been the subject of a comic strip created by Jim Davis. Cartoonist Gary Larson included the character in several of his The Far Side cartoons. In commercial for Bridgestone tires during Super Bowl XLIII in 2009, Mr. Potato Head is driving a car and Mrs. Potato Head is nagging him.

Mr. Potato Head has also acted as spokesman for several causes. In 1987, Mr. Potato Head surrendered his pipe to become the spokesperson for the American Cancer Society's annual "Great American Smokeout" campaign. He performed the role for several years. In 1992, he received a special award from the President's Council for Physical Fitness. In 1996, Mr. and Mrs. Potato Head joined the League of Women Voters and their "Get Out to Vote" campaign.

Larger-than-life versions of Mr. and Mrs. Potato Head are "guests" in the 1980s section of Pop Century Resort at Walt Disney World in Florida.

In 1990, the sketch comedy show In Living Color parodied the toy and entertainer Michael Jackson and his penchant for plastic surgery, offering children a multitude of different noses to represent different stages in Jackson's career. Jackson's vitiligo was also mocked when one child said the toy did not look quite right and then peels it, revealing white skin underneath.

The toy helped inspire the classic Macintosh software toy Tuberling by John Calhoun of Soft Dorothy Software, which was later reimplemented for the K Desktop Environment as KTuberling.

Starting in the 2000s, Mr. and Mrs Potato Head also starred in commercials for other brands. An example is an ad for Lay's Potato Chips where Mr. Potato Head comes home to see Mrs. Potato Head eating them despite being a potato herself. At the end Mr. Potato Head joins in and tells her to keep it their "little secret".

The toy was also referenced in the Rocko's Modern Life episode "Junk Junkies" as Mr. Onion Head.

Mr. Potato head also appeared in The Simpsons episodes "In the Name of the Grandfather" and "The Spy Who Learned Me". A spoof of Mr. Potato Head named Mr. Carrot Head appeared in The Simpsons episode "Angry Dad: The Movie" in 2011.

A spoof named Mr. Zucchini Head appeared as a proposed new toy in the Family Guy episode "The King Is Dead" in 2000. In the Family Guy episode "He's Too Sexy for His Fat", when Dr. Bruce Kaplan unwraps Peter Griffin's bandaged face, he is revealed to have a Mr. Potato Head mask. In the "Brian Sings and Swings" episode, Stewie Griffin uses a Mr. Potato Head ear to change his bleeding ear. In the "April in Quahog" episode, the jury says that there is a blood-splattered Mr. Potato Head. In the "Fighting Irish" episode, Peter dresses up as Mrs. Potato Head. 

In 2015, Melanie Martinez released the song "Mrs. Potato Head" on her debut album Cry Baby.

Toy Story franchise

Production information

Mr. Potato Head is also a character in the Disney/Pixar Toy Story franchise, voiced by Don Rickles. He was one of Andy's toys before being given to Bonnie.

In Toy Story (1995), Mr. Potato Head is shown to be moody towards Andy's other toys, though he is friends with Hamm the piggy bank (John Ratzenberger). When Sheriff Woody (Tom Hanks) accidentally pushes Buzz Lightyear (Tim Allen) out of a window, Potato Head accuses Woody of doing it on purpose. At the end of the film, he is overjoyed to hear Andy's sister Molly getting a Mrs. Potato Head on Christmas.

In Toy Story 2 (1999), Mr. Potato Head goes with Andy's other toys to rescue Woody, who has been stolen by Al McWhiggin (Wayne Knight). After Mr. Potato Head saves three Alien toys (Jeff Pidgeon) from falling out of a Pizza Planet truck, only for them to continually pester him, his wife Mrs. Potato Head (Estelle Harris) decides to adopt them, much to her husband's dismay.

In Toy Story 3 (2010), Mr. Potato Head is one of Andy's remaining toys, alongside his wife, the Aliens, and others. The toys are donated to a daycare center and are later almost killed in a landfill incinerator. When the Aliens rescue the toys with a giant crane, Mr. Potato Head finally accepts them as his sons. Eventually, Mr. Potato Head and his friends are donated to a new owner named Bonnie (Emily Hahn).

Mr. Potato Head has appeared in all three Toy Story Toons shorts: Hawaiian Vacation (2011), Small Fry (2011), and Partysaurus Rex (2012), he didn't have a speaking role in small Fry but Rickles reprising the role in the first and third shorts.

He also appeared in the Halloween special Toy Story of Terror! (2013), where he disappears and Bonnie's other toys must find him.

Mr. Potato Head appeared in the Christmas special, Toy Story That Time Forgot (2014).

Mr. Potato Head appeared in Toy Story 4 (2019). However, Rickles died in 2017 due to kidney failure, and did not record any lines for him for the film. With permission from Rickles's family, Pixar used unreleased lines that Rickles recorded in previous Toy Story films for his final performance as the character. Mr. Potato Head only had 7 lines in Toy Story 4, which was dedicated to Rickles's memory. Mr. Potato Head first appears in the prologue of the movie. Later during the main events of the film, he and his wife join Bonnie and her parents on their RV road trip. At the end of the film, they say goodbye to Woody who chooses to stay with Bo Peep (Annie Potts).

Mr. Potato Head is seen dancing in a Pixar Popcorn short called To Fitness and Beyond

Games

In 1995, a computer game called "Mr. Potato Head Saves Veggie Valley" was released by Hasbro Interactive, aimed at young children.

In 1997, Hasbro Interactive released another game called "Mr. Potato Head's Activity Pack".

Mr. Potato Head has also appeared as the host in all installments of the popular video game series Hasbro Family Game Night. He also appeared in several Toy Story-based video games along with Toy Story Activity Center.

See also
 List of toys
 Potato gun

References

External links

 Mr. Potato Head Brand Update, February 2021

 
1950s toys
1970s toys
1980s toys
1990s toys
2000s toys
2010s toys
Doll brands
Fictional humanoids
Potato Head
Potato Head
Hasbro franchises
Hasbro products
Products introduced in 1952